List of Australian writers by type

List of Australian diarists of World War I

List of Australian diarists of World War I (A-G)

List of Australian diarists of World War I (H-N)

List of Australian diarists of World War I (O-Z)

List of Indigenous Australian writers
  
List of Australian novelists

List of Australian poets

List of Australian women writers

Australian writers
 
Lists of writers by nationality